Ingeltrude, Ingeltrud or Engeltrude is a feminine name of Germanic origin. Historically, it may refer to:
Ingeltrude (fl. 590), abbess of Beaumont-lès-Tours
Ingeltrude, wife of King Pepin I of Aquitaine (d. 838)
Ingeltrude (fl. 860s), wife of Count Boso the Elder
Ingeltrude, hypothetical wife of Henry, Margrave of the Franks (d .886) and daughter of Duke Eberhard of Friuli (d. 866)